Vicente Uematsu (born 30 March 1938) is a Filipino judoka. He competed in the men's lightweight event at the 1964 Summer Olympics.

References

1938 births
Living people
Filipino male judoka
Olympic judoka of the Philippines
Judoka at the 1964 Summer Olympics
Place of birth missing (living people)